Cyril Alexander Garland Luckham (25 July 1907 – 8 February 1989) was an English film, television and theatre actor. He was the husband of stage and screen actress Violet Lamb.

Career 
The son of a paymaster captain in the Royal Navy, Cyril Luckham was educated at RNC Osborne and Dartmouth and briefly followed his father into the service. He was promoted Lieutenant in 1930 and retired the following year, transferring to the Emergency List. Afterwards he trained for the stage with the Arthur Brough school at Folkestone, making his debut with Brough's company there in The Admirable Crichton in 1935. For several years he appeared in provincial repertory, notably with the Rapier Players at Bristol's Little Theatre. He had been promoted to Lieutenant-Commander on the retired list in 1938 and was recalled to the Navy when the War broke out. He was invalided out soon afterwards following serious illness and returned to the theatre. Luckham made his West End debut as Torvald Helmer in A Doll's House at the Arts Theatre in July 1945. For several years afterwards his stage work was largely back in the provinces including the touring company of the Old Vic.
     
Luckham played the White Guardian in the long running science fiction television series Doctor Who. He appeared in The Ribos Operation, the first serial in The Key to Time season, and Enlightenment. In 1965 he played Sir Hugh Archibald-Lake in The Wednesday Play (BBC) Vote, Vote, Vote for Nigel Barton. In the 1967 BBC serialisation of The Forsyte Saga, Luckham played Sir Lawrence Mont, father-in-law of Fleur Forsyte. He appeared in an episode of Randall and Hopkirk (Deceased) (1969); and, as the villain and unscrupulous art dealer in the episode I Always Wanted a Swimming Pool, in the 1971 series of Public Eye. Luckham was a familiar face as a character actor in the 1970's: playing the puppet prime minister in 1971's dystopian TV drama The Guardians, in which the British state becomes one policed by the ubiquitous Guardians; The 7th Duke of Marlborough, in the 1974 Thames mini-series Jennie: Lady Randolph Churchill; Father O'Hara, in Some Mothers Do 'Ave 'Em; the benevolent grandfather, in The Cedar Tree, (a series that ran on ATV from 1975 to 1979); in the 1975 Wodehouse Playhouse episode, 'A Voice from the Past'; as Mr. Luffy, in an episode of the 1978 TV series based on the Famous Five books by Enid Blyton; as the evil psychic, Edward Drexel, in the 1979 supernatural thriller series The Omega Factor; and, as the equitable schoolboard chairman of 'Bamfylde', in the 1980 Andrew Davies (writer)' adaptation of To Serve Them All My Days.

Partial filmography
 Murder in Reverse? (1945) - One of Crossley's Guests
 Stranger from Venus (1954) - Dr. Meinard
 Out of the Clouds (1955) - The Doctor
 The Battle of the River Plate (1956) - Lt. Jasper Abbot - HMS Achilles (uncredited)
 The Hostage (1956) - Hugh Ferguson
 Yangtse Incident: The Story of H.M.S. Amethyst (1957) - Commander-in-Chief Far Eastern Station
 How to Murder a Rich Uncle (1957) - Coroner
 The Birthday Present (1957) - Magistrate
 Invasion Quartet (1961) - Col. Harbottle
 Some People (1962) - Magistrate
 Billy Budd (1962) - Alfred Hallam - Captain of Marines
 Espionage (TV series) ('Do You Remember Leo Winters', episode) (1964) - Admiral Bond
 The Pumpkin Eater (1964) - Doctor
 The Great War (BBC TV, 1965) 
 The Alphabet Murders (1965) - Sir Carmichael Clarke
 A Man for All Seasons (1966) - Archbishop Cranmer
 The Naked Runner (1967) - Cabinet minister
 Anne of the Thousand Days (1969) - Prior Houghton
 One More Time (1970) - Magistrate
 Mr. Forbush and the Penguins (1971) - Tringham
 The Guardians (1971) - Sir Timothy Hobson
 The Cedar Tree (1976-1978) - Charles Ashley
 Providence (1977 film) - Doctor Mark Eddington
 The Omega Factor  (1979) - Drexel

References

External links
 

1907 births
1989 deaths
English male stage actors
English male television actors
20th-century British male actors